WHAV-LP (97.9 FM) – branded 97.9 WHAV – is a non-commercial low-power radio station licensed to serve Haverhill, Massachusetts. Owned by Public Media of New England, Inc., WHAV-LP services the immediate Merrimack Valley and considers itself the successor station to the original WHAV (1490 AM), also licensed to Haverhill, and transmits from WHAV's original 1947 transmitter site; however, the original WHAV continues operations to this day as WCCM. Besides a standard analog transmission, WHAV-LP's audio is also carried, in part, by a number of public, educational, and government access (PEG) cable television stations, and is available online.

History

What had been the original WHAV (1490 AM) changed formats and call signs on September 8, 2002, when owner Costa-Eagle Radio Ventures Limited Partnership—a partnership between Pat Costa and The Eagle-Tribune—completed a complicated three-way format and call letter swap between their three AM stations in the region. WCCM (800 AM) moved to the WHAV frequency at 1490 kHz, WNNW moved to WCCM’s 800 kHz frequency and WHAV’s programming moved to WNNW’s 1110 kHz frequency and became known as WCEC. During the summer of 2007, another frequency swap occurred and WCCM moved to 1110 kHz and WCEC moved to 1490 kHz.

In a series of legal filings, the right to the WHAV name was assumed by COCO+CO., Inc.’s Xelocast division, using it to launch a new English-language Internet radio station January 3, 2004 at whav.net. Since that time, a number of cable television stations have also agreed to carry its locally oriented programming.  WHAV also broadcasts at low power on 1640 AM for the Haverhill area.

The Eagle-Tribune and its associated ventures, including the Haverhill Gazette (which owned the original WHAV from 1947 to 1954), were sold in December 2005 to Birmingham, Alabama-based Community Newspaper Holdings Inc., leaving the new WHAV as the last 100 percent locally owned news medium in the region. In 2012, The Eagle-Tribune and Haverhill Gazette offices in Haverhill closed.

In the fall of 2013, Public Media of New England, Inc. submitted WHAV’s application to the Federal Communications Commission for an LPFM license at 98.1 MHz. This was later changed to 97.9 MHz, and a construction permit was granted on January 9, 2015, with the callsign WHAV-LP.

See also
List of community radio stations in the United States

References

External links
 

HAV
Mass media in Essex County, Massachusetts
Haverhill, Massachusetts
Community radio stations in the United States
Radio stations established in 2016
2016 establishments in Massachusetts
HAV-LP